Edward Raquello (born Edward Zylberberg Kucharski; 14 May 1900 – 24 August 1976) was a Polish-American actor of stage and screen. 

Raquello immigrated to the United States in March 1926. Although from Eastern Europe, he specialized in playing Latin Lover roles in Hollywood. He also performed frequently on the stage. For instance, in 1931, he was in the cast of Wonder Bar, headlined by Al Jolson. In 1932, he was in New York to Cherbourg at the Forrest Theatre, New York City. In 1933, he appeared with Rose Hobart and Humphrey Bogart at the Booth Theatre in the comedy, Our Wife. In June 1934, he co-starred with Betty Bronson in Genius in Love at the Elverhoj Theatre in Kingston, New York. In January 1935, he starred as Al Pomo, Public Enemy Number One, in Nowhere Bound, a melodrama about undesirable aliens on board a deportation train; written by Leo Birinski, it was presented at the Imperial Theatre in New York City. In 1936 and 1937, he was in the original production of Idiot's Delight with Alfred Lunt and Lynn Fontanne. In 1941, he was in the touring company of There Shall Be No Night, in a cast headed by Alfred Lunt and Lynn Fontanne. Following the end of the Second World War and through the 1960s, he was a program director and executive producer at the Voice of America radio for the United States Information Agency.

Filmography

References

Bibliography
 Hanke, Ken. Charlie Chan at the Movies: History, Filmography, and Criticism. McFarland, 1990.

External links

1900 births
1976 deaths
Polish male stage actors
Polish male film actors
Polish emigrants to the United States
Male actors from Warsaw